Fargo Air National Guard Base is a United States Air National Guard facility located at Hector International Airport in Fargo, North Dakota. The 119th Wing is based at Fargo and operates the MQ-9A Reaper.

History 
The North Dakota Air National Guard was established on 16 January 1947 at Hector Airport, Fargo.

Based units 
Flying and notable non-flying units based at Fargo Air National Guard Base.

United States Air Force 
Air National Guard

 North Dakota Air National Guard
 119th Wing
 Headquarters 119th Wing
 119th Operations Group
 119th Maintenance Squadron
 119th Operations Support Squadron
 178th Attack Squadron – MQ-9A Reaper
 119th Intelligence, Reconnaissance, and Surveillance Group
 176th Intelligence Squadron
 177th Intelligence Squadron
 119th Intelligence Support Squadron
 119th Medical Group
 119th Mission Support Group
 119th Civil Engineering Squadron
 119th Force Support Squadron
 119th Logistics Readiness Squadron
 119th Security Forces Squadron

See also
 North Dakota World War II Army Airfields
 Fargo Air Museum

References

External links
North Dakota Air National Guard website

Installations of the United States Air Force in North Dakota
Fargo, North Dakota
Airports in North Dakota
Installations of the United States Air National Guard
Buildings and structures in Cass County, North Dakota